Rokopella brummeri is a species of monoplacophoran, a superficially limpet-like marine mollusc. It is found in the northern Atlantic Ocean.

References

Monoplacophora
Molluscs described in 1993